Surak Rural District is a rural district (dehestan) in the Lirdaf District of Jask County, Hormozgan Province, Iran. At the 2006 census, its population was 5,978, in 1,362 families.  The rural district has 34 villages.

References 

Rural Districts of Hormozgan Province
Jask County